Mohammad Panah was a prominent Afghan military commander loyal to Ahmad Shah Massoud. Panah earned popularity as he successfully fought in various soviet incursions in the Panjsher valley and northern areas of Afghanistan. Following the withdrawal of USSR forces from Afghanistan and the subsequent collapse of the communist regime in Kabul, Panah was a commander alongside Mohammad Fahim in the northern Kabul fronts fighting first Hezb-e-islami Hekmatyar and then the Taliban. He was killed in Paghman District during a Taliban offensive on Kabul.

Early Life and Education
General Mohammad Panah was born in 1957 in Sefid Chehar village of Panjshir Province. Mohammad Panah started his basic religious education with the scholars of that time in Sefidchehr school.
At the age of 21, he was forcibly recruited as a soldier by the communist regime and sent to Herat Province, Afghanistan.
But from the very first days, understanding the situation with a spirit of fighting against the puppet government, he separated from the government forces and joined the ranks of the first Jihadist organization of the Panjshir Valley.
And under the leadership of the Afghanistan's national hero, Ahmad Shah Massoud, he engaged in military activity against the communist regime.

In a short period of time, he showed his talent and military skills. This made it noticeable among the people.
And he continued to seize bases and conquer large military centers of the Russian aggressor army in the regions of Panjshir, Salang, Takhar, Baghlan, Parwan, and Kapisa.

In 1981, he was appointed as the commander of mobile military groups and played a prominent and decisive role in repelling two large and powerful invasions of the Red Army in the Panjshir Valley.

General Panah during the height of the bloody attacks of the Red Army on the Panjshir valley, was in charge the command of Chamalwarde Military base, which is considered one of the important bases of the Mujahideen in the war against the occupiers; 

and together with People under his command, inflicted crushing blows on the body of the aggressor enemy.

Mohammad Panah was appointed as the general commander of Salangs by the front leadership in 1981. And during the three years of his command, he planned and carried out several operations and attacks against the aggressor forces of the Soviet Union. With the forces under his command, he destroyed hundreds of enemy armored vehicles and looted hundreds of weapons of the aggressors and captured dozens Soviet officers and soldiers.

The saga of Mohammad Panah's actions in the Salang Valley became popular among the Afghan people and became a sign of the bravery of the Mujahideen at the level of the world, that even the Soviet Red Army called him General Panah and the Salang Valley as the Valley of Deaths.

The heavy blows of General Mohammad Panah and the forces under his command against the soldiers of the Red Army and the communist puppet government of the time; It caused the communist puppet regime to put General Panah in the so-called exclusive revolutionary court; He was sentenced to death in absentia, which showed the disgrace and indolence of the leaders of the communist regime at the time and made General Mohammad Panah more popular than before with the Mujahideen and the Muslim people of Afghanistan.

Panah was victorious in various wars against the world's largest military machine. He was known as a talented and innovative commander.
In 1986, Panah went to Baghlan province for planning and carrying out attacks on the aggressor and puppet forces of the Soviet Union, and established his command center in the mountainous areas of 'Nahrin', and for a year, he was busy with  directing and managing the forces of the 'Mujahideen'.
General Mohammad Panah played a prominent and decisive role in the conquests of the Farkhar Garrison, the Kalfgan Garrison, the Nahrin Division, the conquest of Taloqan, the capital of Takhar Province, and several other guerilla operations in the northern parts of the country.
After the expulsion of the Red Army from the country and the expansion of the areas under the control of the Mojahedin, Panah, as the commander of the first unit of the central organization of the Islamic State Army of the Mojahedeen, was appointed and in the conquest of the remaining areas of Takhar province, he was in charge of commanding a part of several wars that led to the conquest of Khwaja Ghar, Takhar Province and KhanAbad and Dasht Archi Districts of Kunduz Province.
General Mohammad Panah played a key and decisive role in the victory of the Islamic Revolution and the conquest of Kabul. After capturing the main centers of the regime in Jabal Siraj, Charikar and Bagram, he entered Kabul as the first commander of the conquering Jihadi forces and strengthened the foundations of the government. 
During his three years of work in the Islamic State of Afghanistan, Panah was in charge of a part of the defense battles of the defenseless people in the fronts of Kapisa, Parwan, Bamyan, Baghlan and Kabul provinces and acted as a serious commander. And he made a unique resistance and stand against the aggressors and terrorists.
Panah never got tired of fighting for the right, fought honestly and always created epics.

Died Information
Panah was Killed in the battle against the terrorist Taliban on the night of 15 Mar 1995, along with two of his comrades, Dr. hammad Amin and Mohammad Irfan.
Panah at the peak of fame, popularity and power;  lived in a poor but victorious way and Manner.

See Also
Ahmad shah massoud
Qasim fahim
Ahmad massoud
Hasib qoway markaz

References

Afghan military personnel
Panah, Shaheed
Year of death missing
Year of birth missing